Alma e Coração (Heart & Soul) is a Portuguese telenovela which began airing on SIC on September 17, 2018, and ending on October 11, 2019.

Plot 
Two mothers and a life of lies, which one would you choose?

Benedita Almeida (Cláudia Vieira) now answers by the name Diana. She had a perfect relationship with her boyfriend André, a skipper who had just proposed to her. At the same time she finds out she is pregnant and is about to break the news to him, she discovers he is transporting women for an illegal prostitution network in Italy. Oblivious to the fact that her grandfather Albano is head of the network, she asks him for help.

He orders her death. She survives and falls into a coma, carrying on with her pregnancy, awakening on the day she goes into labor. She realizes the man who raised her is a monster, so she decides to leave her daughter at the doorsteps of a church and fake their death.

When she disappeared to those who knew her, she came up with a new identity while finding refuge in a traveling circus. She left her home town of Porto and was thought to have died, along with her newborn daughter.
At the circus nobody asks questions about her past or the scar on her face and she travels the world with her new “family”.

20 years later, Diana decides to move back to Portugal, confident she has managed to escape her past, finding a job at a performing arts and circus school. Little does she know she is close to coming face to face to with she was running from.

Júlia (Soraia Chaves), who was hospitalized 20 years ago for a heart transplant. The organ she receives belonged to Albano, Diana's grandfather who was an evil man. Julia has always been a kind woman, but her personality changed, ever since she had surgery. The sweet and positive woman gave way to an increasingly bitter person. Her only concern seems to be the daughter she illegally adopted, Victoria (Madalena Almeida).

Victoria is André (Afonso Pimentel) and Diana's daughter. She becomes a girl with an open smile, but with a black soul. Julia created her in her image, turning Victoria into what Albano wanted to transform Diana.

When an evil heart changes your soul.

Cast

References

External links
 

Portuguese telenovelas
2018 telenovelas
2018 Portuguese television series debuts
2019 Portuguese television series endings
Sociedade Independente de Comunicação telenovelas
Portuguese-language telenovelas